He Lin (born 11 November 1957) is a Chinese engineer, a major general (shaojiang) of the People's Liberation Army (PLA), and an academician of the Chinese Academy of Engineering.

Biography 
He was born in Xi'an, Shaanxi, on 11 November 1957, while his ancestral home in Xichong County, Sichuan. He attended Xi'an University of Science and Technology, graduating in 1981 with a bachelor's degree in engineering mechanics. He went on to receive his master's degree in marine engineering in 1984 at the Naval University of Engineering.

After university, he stayed at the university and worked successively as an assistant, lecturer, associate professor, professor, and doctoral supervisor. He joined the Communist Party in May 1987. In December 1997, he was promoted to dean of its Naval Ship Vibration and Noise Research Institute.

Honours and awards 
 2009 State Science and Technology Progress Award (Second Class)
 2012 State Science and Technology Progress Award (Second Class)
 2013 Science and Technology Progress Award of the Ho Leung Ho Lee Foundation
 November 27, 2017 Member of the Chinese Academy of Engineering (CAE)

References 

1957 births
Living people
People from Xi'an
Engineers from Shaanxi
Xi'an University of Science and Technology alumni
People's Liberation Army generals from Shaanxi
Members of the Chinese Academy of Engineering